Gunnera magellanica is a perennial rhizomatous dioeceous herb native to Chile, Argentina and the Falkland Islands, and Andean areas of Peru, Ecuador. In the southern part of its range it grows in damper parts of the Magellanic Forests, and shrub formations on Tierra del Fuego, with an altitudinal range from sea level to 1500m.

Description 
Unlike its congeners, G. tinctoria and G. manicata, the leaves are small, approximately 6 cm across. They are rounded or kidney-shaped, stipulate on long (2–10 cm) petioles, with crenate edges.

Flowers are unisexual, with female inflorescences shorter than male ones. The fruit is a bright red berry (drupe) 3–5 mm in diameter.

The leaves die back in the austral autumn, so G. magellanica perennates as under-ground rhizomes, and is therefore classified as a cryptophyte.

Taxonomy 
Gunnera magellanica was first described Jean-Baptiste Lamarck in Encyclopédie Méthodique, Botanique 3: 61, t. 801, f. 2. 1789.
Etymology
Gunnera: the generic name honours the  Norwegian botanist and bishop Johan Ernst Gunnerus.

magellanica: geographical epithet referring to its distribution in proximity to the Magellan Straits.
Synonyms
 Gunnera falklandica Hook.
 Gunnera integrifolia Blume
 Gunnera plicata Vahl
 Gunnera reniformis Gay ex Blume
 Misandra magellanica (Lam.) J.F. Gmel.

In popular culture

Vernacular Names 
Vernacular names are Frutilla del Diablo in Spanish, and in English on the Falkland Islands it is called Pigvine or Pig Vine.

Garden plant 
Gardeners in English-speaking countries know it as baby gunnera, devil's strawberry (probably a direct translation of the Spanish name)  or dwarf rhubarb. As a garden plant G. magellanica can be used as ground cover, but is sometimes invasive. It rarely fruits as it is dioecious and both male and female plants are needed.

Stamps 
G. magellanica featured on the 1½ d. stamp of the 1968 "Floral Issue" of Falkland Island postage stamps.

References

Bibliography 
 Foster, R. C. 1958. A catalogue of the ferns and flowering plants of Bolivia. Contr. Gray Herb. 184: 1–223.
 Jørgensen, P. M. & C. Ulloa Ulloa. 1994. Seed plants of the high Andes of Ecuador---A checklist. AAU Rep. 34: 1–443.
 Jørgensen, P. M. & S. León-Yánez. (eds.) 1999. Catalogue of the vascular plants of Ecuador. Monogr. Syst. Bot. Missouri Bot. Gard. 75: i–viii, 1–1181.
 Luteyn, J. L. 1999. Páramos, a checklist of plant diversity, geographical distribution, and botanical literature. Mem. New York Bot. Gard. 84: viii–xv, 1–278.
 Macbride, J. F. 1959. Haloragaceae, Flora of Peru. Publ. Field Mus. Nat. Hist., Bot. Ser. 13(5/1): 3–8.
 Marticorena, C. & M. Quezada. 1985. Catálogo de la Flora Vascular de Chile. Gayana, Bot. 42: 1–157.
 Mora-Osejo, L. 1984. Haloragaceae. 3: 1–178. In P. Pinto-Escobar & P. M. Ruiz (eds.) Fl. Colombia. Universidad Nacional de Colombia, Santafé de Bogotá.
 Zuloaga, F. O., O. Morrone, M. J. Belgrano, C. Marticorena & E. Marchesi. (eds.) 2008. Catálogo de las Plantas Vasculares del Cono Sur (Argentina, Sur de Brasil, Chile, Paraguay y Uruguay). Monogr. Syst. Bot. Missouri Bot. Gard. 107(1): i–xcvi, 1–983; 107(2): i–xx, 985–2286; 107(3): i–xxi, 2287–3348.

External links 

 Reiche's Flora de Chile, account of Genus Gunnera (pdf) at eFloras.
 Gunnera magellanica at Shoot Gardening.
 Gunnera magellanica at Enciclopedia de la Flora Chileana.
 Gunnera magellanica at the Alpine Garden Society Plant Encyclopedia.

magellanica
Flora of South America